Vaishali Menon is an Indian costume designer and actress who designed for Firaaq (2009) and Unfreedom (2014). She acted in Suno Na... Ek Nanhi Aawaz (2009). She received the Filmfare Award for Best Costume Design in 2010 for Firaaq.

Filmography

Costume Designer
 Kiss Kis Ko (2004)
 Firaaq (2009)
 Unfreedom (2014)

Actress
 Suno Na.. Ek Nanhi Aawaz (2009) as Pre-natal course wife

Awards

References

External links
 

Indian costume designers
Fashion stylists
Filmfare Awards winners
Year of birth missing (living people)
Living people